Address Unknown is a 2001 South Korean film directed by Kim Ki-duk. It was the opening film of the 2001 Venice Film Festival. The film is based on real-life stories from the director's life, and those known to him.

Plot
The residents living in the South Korean countryside around a U.S. military base are affected by its presence. These include an unstable, near psychotic American soldier (Mitch Malem) who survives on a diet of LSD and rage, Eun-ok, a girl with one defective eye, Jihum a lonesome boy and Chang-guk, who lives in an old abandoned U.S. Air Force bus with his mother. She has taught Chang-guk English in an attempt to prepare him for their new life in the United States, reunited with his father whom she mails regularly, although the letters are always returned "address unknown".

Cast 
Dong-kun Yang - Chang-Guk

Young-min Kim - Ji-Hum

Ban Min-Jung - Eun-Ok

Jae Hyun Cho - Dog-Eye

Pang Eun-Jin - Chang-Guk's Mother

Myung Kye-Nam - Ji-Hum's Father

Jim Morse - Military Police

Reception 
The film was generally well received. Kim Ki-duk's direction throughout is excellent. His visuals capture the unremitting empty desolation of the villager's surroundings. With Seo Jeong-min's cinematography, the picture looks grimy and cold, like it's been dragged across the damp, dirty ground before being processed. There's very little in the way of the pretty or picturesque, the colour palette exuding a subdued and murky feel. Also, he maintains the heavy sense of metaphor within the piece. So often do scenes go on behind closed doors, or are obscured by plastic sheeting, branches or chain-link fences. Much of it also unfolds at a distance. These characters are trapped in this place, beyond the help of others, whether they know it or not.

References

External links
 
 
 Interview with Kim Ki-duk at AsianDB.com

2001 films
2000s war drama films
Films directed by Kim Ki-duk
South Korean independent films
2000s Korean-language films
South Korean war drama films
2001 independent films
2001 drama films
2000s South Korean films